Ilimuda is a volcano located in the eastern part of the island of Flores, Indonesia. It lies north of Lewotobi volcano and west of the Konga Bay.

See also 
 List of volcanoes in Indonesia

References 
 

Ilimuda
Ilimuda
Ilimuda
Pleistocene stratovolcanoes